Daimler Green is an urban village approximately two miles north of Coventry city centre, in the West Midlands, England.

It was built on the site of the Daimler factory in Radford. The railway provided a railway station for the car factory workers, Daimler Halt station was closed in 1965. The factory closed in 1997 and was quickly demolished. The urban village was approved for redevelopment in 1999. The first residential properties were occupied in 2000.

References

Daimler Green